The 1984 Golden Bay Earthquakes season was the club's eleventh as a franchise in the North American Soccer League, then the top tier of American soccer. The Earthquakes finished in fifth place in the Western Division. The League folded at the end of the season, and the team would then participate in the four-team 1985 Western Alliance Challenge Series, which led to the formal establishment of the Western Soccer Alliance in 1986.

Squad
The 1984 squad

Competitions

NASL

Match results

Season 

* = ShootoutSource:

Standings

Western Division

References

External links
The Year in American Soccer – 1984 | NASL
San Jose Earthquakes All-time Game Results | Soccerstats.us
San Jose Earthquakes Rosters | nasljerseys.com

San Jose Earthquakes seasons
Golden Bay
Golden Bay
1984 in sports in California